Elections to Carrickfergus Borough Council were held on 19 May 1993 on the same day as the other Northern Irish local government elections. The election used three district electoral areas to elect a total of 17 councillors.

Election results

Note: "Votes" are the first preference votes.

Districts summary

|- class="unsortable" align="centre"
!rowspan=2 align="left"|Ward
! % 
!Cllrs
! % 
!Cllrs
! %
!Cllrs
! %
!Cllrs
! %
!Cllrs
!rowspan=2|TotalCllrs
|- class="unsortable" align="center"
!colspan=2 bgcolor="" | Alliance
!colspan=2 bgcolor="" | UUP
!colspan=2 bgcolor="" | DUP
!colspan=2 bgcolor="" | Conservative
!colspan=2 bgcolor="white"| Others
|-
|align="left"|Carrick Castle
|bgcolor="#F6CB2F"|38.9
|bgcolor="#F6CB2F"|2
|13.3
|1
|22.8
|1
|0.0
|0
|25.0
|1
|5
|-
|align="left"|Kilroot
|bgcolor="#F6CB2F"|29.3
|bgcolor="#F6CB2F"|2
|26.8
|2
|13.0
|0
|13.3
|1
|17.6
|1
|6
|-
|align="left"|Knockagh Monument
|bgcolor="#F6CB2F"|29.8
|bgcolor="#F6CB2F"|2
|29.7
|2
|21.2
|1
|5.8
|0
|13.5
|1
|6
|-
|- class="unsortable" class="sortbottom" style="background:#C9C9C9"
|align="left"| Total
|32.2
|6
|24.0
|5
|18.5
|2
|7.1
|1
|18.2
|3
|17
|-
|}

Districts results

Carrick Castle

1989: 2 x Alliance, 1 x DUP, 1 x UUP, 1 x PUP
1993: 2 x Alliance, 1 x DUP, 1 x UUP, 1 x Independent
1989-1993 Change: Independent gain from PUP

Kilroot

1989: 2 x UUP, 1 x Alliance, 1 x DUP, 1 x Independent Unionist
1993: 2 x Alliance, 2 x UUP, 1 x Conservative, 1 x Independent Unionist
1989-1993 Change: Alliance and Conservative gain from DUP and due to the addition of one seat

Knockagh Monument

1989: 2 x Independent Unionist, 1 x Alliance, 1 x UUP, 1 x DUP
1993: 2 x Alliance, 2 x UUP, 1 x DUP, 1 x Independent Unionist
1989-1993 Change: Alliance and UUP gain from Independent Unionist and due to the addition of one seat

References

Carrickfergus Borough Council elections
Carrickfergus